The 31st Annual TV Week Logie Awards was held on Friday 17 March 1989 at the Hyatt on Collins in Melbourne, and broadcast on the Seven Network. The ceremony was hosted by Bert Newton and guests included Raquel Welch, Leslie Nielsen and Bryan Brown.

Winners

Gold Logie
Most Popular Personality on Australian Television
Winner:
Daryl Somers in Hey Hey It's Saturday (Nine Network)

Acting/Presenting

Most Popular Actor
Winner:
Craig McLachlan in Neighbours (Network Ten)

Most Popular Actress
Winner:
Annie Jones in Neighbours (Network Ten)

Most Popular Actor in a Telemovie or Miniseries
Winner:
Bryan Brown in The Shiralee (Seven Network)

Most Popular Actress in a Telemovie or Miniseries
Winner:
Rebecca Smart in The Shiralee (Seven Network)

Most Outstanding Actor
Winner:
John Wood in Rafferty's Rules (Seven Network)

Most Outstanding Actress
Winner:
Joan Sydney in A Country Practice (Seven Network)

Most Popular Light Entertainment or Comedy Personality
Winner:
Mary-Anne Fahey in The Comedy Company (Network Ten)

Most Popular New Talent
Winner:
Nicolle Dickson in Home and Away (Seven Network)

Most Popular Programs/Videos

Most Popular Series
Winner:
Neighbours (Network Ten)

Most Popular Telemovie or Miniseries
Winner:
The Shiralee (Seven Network)

Most Popular Light Entertainment or Comedy Program
Winner:
The Comedy Company (Network Ten)

Most Popular Public Affairs Program
Winner:
A Current Affair (Nine Network)

Most Popular Sports Coverage
Winner:
Seoul Olympic Games (Network Ten)

Most Popular Children's Show
Winner:
Wombat (Seven Network)

Most Popular Music Video
Winner:
"Age of Reason" by John Farnham

Most Outstanding Programs

Most Outstanding Single Documentary or Documentary Series
Winner:
Nature of Australia (ABC TV)

Most Outstanding Achievement in News
Winner:
"Walsh Street murders", Michael Venus (Nine Network)

Most Outstanding Achievement in Public Affairs
Winner:
Four Corners (ABC TV)

Most Outstanding Achievement by Regional Television
Winner:
Walkabout Documentaries (RTQ7)

Performers
"The Golden Girls" (Lorrae Desmond, Hazel Phillips, Pat McDonald, Jeanne Little, Denise Drysdale, Rowena Wallace)
John Farnham
Norman Gunston

Hall of Fame
After years in the Australian television industry, Bryan Brown became the sixth inductee into the TV Week Logies Hall of Fame.

References

External links
 

1989 in Australian television
1989 television awards
1989